Sebastian Berwick (born 15 December 1999) is an Australian cyclist, who currently rides for UCI WorldTeam .

Major results
2017
 Oceania Junior Road Championships
1st  Road race
1st  Time trial
 3rd  Time trial Commonwealth Youth Games
 10th Time trial, UCI Junior Road World Championships
2019
 10th Overall Tour of Thailand
2020
 2nd Overall Herald Sun Tour
1st  Young rider classification
 2nd Road race, National Under-23 Championships
2021
 1st Stage 1b (TTT) Settimana Internazionale di Coppi e Bartali
2022
 1st Stage 5 Alpes Isère Tour

Grand Tour general classification results timeline

References

External links
 

1999 births
Living people
Australian male cyclists
Cyclists from Brisbane